Francesco Bianchi (15 January 1940 – 20 September 1977) was an Italian middle distance runner, that won a gold medal at the Mediterranean Games.

Biography
Francesco Bianchi participated at one edition of the Summer Olympics (1964).

National titles
Francesco Bianchi won nine times the individual national championship.
5 wins on 800 metres (1961, 1962, 1964, 1965, 1967)
4 wins on 1500 metres (1962, 1963, 1964, 1965)

See also
800 metres winners of Italian Athletics Championships
1500 metres winners of Italian Athletics Championships

References

External links
 

1940 births
1977 deaths
People from Melegnano
Italian male middle-distance runners
Olympic athletes of Italy
Athletes (track and field) at the 1964 Summer Olympics
Mediterranean Games gold medalists for Italy
Athletes (track and field) at the 1963 Mediterranean Games
Mediterranean Games medalists in athletics
Sportspeople from the Metropolitan City of Milan